Dennis Chiedozie Oli (born 28 January 1984 in Newham, England) is an English footballer who plays for Grays Athletic in the Isthmian League North Division. He previously played for Queens Park Rangers, Gravesend & Northfleet, Farnborough Town, Swansea City, Cambridge United, Grays Athletic,  Gillingham, Wycombe Wanderers, Havant & Waterlooville, Hemel Hempstead Town, Farnborough, Thurrock and Kingstonian.

Career
Oli came through the youth system at Queens Park Rangers and made his debut in a 1–1 draw with Wigan Athletic in February 2002. He made 23 league appearances for Queen Park Rangers but was sent on loan to Gravesend & Northfleet in November 2003 to gain more first-team experience. This was followed by a one-month loan to Farnborough Town in February 2004. He joined Swansea City on a free transfer in August 2004 but made only one appearance before leaving at the end of the month. He joined Cambridge United on a one-month deal in September 2004 after impressing during a short trial spell. He made four appearances, scoring one goal against Mansfield, for Cambridge but chose to leave at the end of his one-month contract in October 2004.

Oli joined Grays Athletic and made 28appearances in the remainder of the 2004–05 season as Grays won promotion to the Conference National as Conference South champions and won the FA Trophy. He made a further 46 appearances for Grays in the 2005–06 season as Grays reached the promotion playoffs and won the FA Trophy for a second year, when he scored the opening goal in the 2–0 victory over Woking. He made 48 league and cup appearances in the 2006–07 season as Grays finished above the relegation places, and signed a new two-year contract with Grays in May 2007.

Former Grays manager, Mark Stimson, signed Oli for Gillingham on loan in November 2007 with a view to a permanent move in January 2008. Oli made his Gillingham debut in a Football League Trophy southern section quarter final at home to Dagenham & Redbridge, scoring his first goal rounding off the 4–0 win on 13 November 2007. He signed a permanent contract at Gillingham in January 2008, keeping him at the club until 2010, and in that time, he helped Gillingham win the League Two play-off final at Wembley Stadium.

In July 2012, Oli joined Wycombe Wanderers on a one-year deal, but was released a year later after not being offered a new contract. He then signed for Havant & Waterlooville of the Conference South.

Ahead of the 2017–18 season, Oli once again joined Mark Stimson signing for Thurrock.

Honours
FA Trophy: 2005, 2006
Conference South (VI): 2005
Football League Two play-off winner 2008-09

References

External links
Dennis Oli player profile at gillinghamfootballclub.com
Dennis Oli player profile at qpr.co.uk

Dennis Oli 2004–05 stats at SoccerFactsUK
Dennis Oli 2005–06 stats at SoccerFactsUK
Dennis Oli 2006–07 stats at SoccerFactsUK
Dennis Oli 2007–08 stats at SoccerFactsUK

1984 births
Living people
People educated at St Bonaventure's Catholic School
English footballers
Association football wingers
Association football forwards
English Football League players
National League (English football) players
Isthmian League players
Southern Football League players
Queens Park Rangers F.C. players
Ebbsfleet United F.C. players
Farnborough F.C. players
Swansea City A.F.C. players
Cambridge United F.C. players
Grays Athletic F.C. players
Gillingham F.C. players
Wycombe Wanderers F.C. players
Havant & Waterlooville F.C. players
Hemel Hempstead Town F.C. players
Thurrock F.C. players
Kingstonian F.C. players
England semi-pro international footballers
Footballers from the London Borough of Newham
English people of Jamaican descent
English people of Nigerian descent